Empress Gifty (formerly Empress Gifty Osei) is a Ghanaian gospel musician and fashionista. She is the first Gospel Artist in Ghana to hit 1 Million Followers on Instagram.

Early life and education 
Empress was born to the  Oppong and Annan family both from Central and Western Region of Ghana. She started her Primary School education at Mantey Din Primary School and Oninku Junior Secondary School all in Tema. She continued to a fashion school in Tema and after graduating, she opened her own fashion school in Tema where she trained students in fashion and lifestyle.

Music career 
Empress Gifty has collaborations with Opanka and Zaza Mohkheti from South Africa. She has hit songs like Aseda, Fefeefe, Epikye, Adensiedie, Adom, Jesus Over do, Jesus be too much, Odiyompo and Eye Woa.

She was awarded the artiste of the year in the 2018 National Gospel Music Awards. In 2019 she led the nomination list in the Maranatha Global Worship Music Awards held in Kenya.

She won VGMA Gospel Artist of the Year and Album of the Year in 2012, and won 4syte Gospel Music Video of the Year in 2021.

She hosts The Resurrection Effect Concert every year.

Personal life 
She is married to Ghanaian politician, Hopeson Adorye with two children.

Discography 
Aseda - 2007

Feefeefe - 2012

Jesús be too much - 2014

Ebenezar - 2017

Jesus over do - 2020

Odiyompo - 2021

Eye woaa - 2021

Awards/nominations

References 

Year of birth missing (living people)
Living people
Ghanaian women musicians
21st-century Ghanaian musicians